In June 2013, the honorary members of the Accademia delle Arti del Disegno of Florence were:

 Hussah Al-Sabah
 Aldo Angioi
 Pier Fausto Bagatti Valsecchi
 Pier Luigi Ballini
 Roberta Bartoli
 Sandro Bellesi
 Mario Bencivenni
 Paola Benigni
 Sergio Bertelli
 Christoph Bertsch
 Françoise Bissarra-Fréreau
 Vincenzo Bogliaccino
 Nana-Kow Bondzie
 Maurizio Bossi
 Isak Mathys Botha
 Andrea Branzi
 Aldo Buoncristiano
 François Burchardt
 Daniel Buren
 Susanna Buricchi
 Sandra Buyet
 Remo Buti
 Franco Camarlinghi
 Luigi Cappugi
 Giovanni Carbonara
 Fernando Caruncho
 Stefano Casciu
 Pier Angiolo Cetica
 Miles E. Chappell
 Andrea Chiti Batelli
 Marco Ciatti
 Enrico Colle
 Giuseppe Luigi Coluccia
 Michel Conan
 Simonella Condemi
 Giovanni Conti
 Roberto Contini
 Mario Cusmano
 Charles Davis
 Carlo Del Bravo
 Andrea Del Guercio
 Romano Del Nord
 Stefano De Rosa
 Hugues De Varine Bohan
 Elio Di Franco
 Luftu Dogan
 Georges Dontas
 Francesco D'Ostilio
 Elisabeth von Driander Treviranus
 Francesco Durante
 Marco Fagioli
 Marzia Faietti
 Ramon Falcon
 Italo Faldi
 Franca Falletti di Villafalletto
 Luigi Fatichi
 Giorgio Fiorenza
 Anna Forlani Tempesti
 Andrea Claudio Galluzzo
 Ali Gengeli
 Gabriella Gentilini
 Giancarlo Gentilini
 Alessandro Gioli
 Anna Maria Giusti
 Giuliano Gori
 Gianfranco Grimaldi
 Carlo Guaita
 René Maurice Gueye
 Alessandro Guidotti
 Margaret Haines
 Herman Hertzberger
 Michael Hirst
 Madaleine Hours
 Elisabetta Insabato
 Jasper Johns
 Pierre Lalive D'Épinay
 Carlo Lapucci
 Rita Levi Montalcini
 Gina Lollobrigida
 Tomislav Maksimovic
 Duccio Mannucci
 Giampiero Maracchi
 Carlo Marchiori
 Paolo Marconi
 Corrado Marsan
 Lara Vinca Masini
 Mario Matteucci
 Silvia Meloni Trkulja
 Bartolomeo Migone
 Maria Augusta Morelli Timpanaro
 Gabriele Morolli
 Rosanna Morozzi
 Alessandro Nova
 Hendrik van Os
 Piero Pacini
 Claude François Parent
 Francesca Petrucci
 Renzo Piano
 Giovanni Pieraccini
 Sandra Pinto
 Silvano Piovanelli
 Pina Ragionieri
 Tullia Romagnoli Carettoni
 Franca Roselli
 Pierre Rosenberg
 Niccolò Rosselli Del Turco
 Franco Scaramuzzi
 Pierre Schneider
 Erkinger Schwarzenberg
 Magnolia Scudieri
 Ludovica Sebregondi
 Max Seidel
 Salvatore Settis
 Maria Sframeli
 Giorgio Simoncini
 Francesco Sisinni
 Edoardo Speranza
 Valdo Spini
 Elena Staccioli
 Cristos Stremmenos
 Franck Sznura
 Angelo Tartuferi
 Serguei Tikhvinsky
 Luigi Ulivieri
 Mario Ursino
 Maria Grazia Vaccari
 Domenico Valentino
 Cesare Vasoli
 Timothy Verdon
 Edoardo Vesentini
 Robert Venturi
 Rosario Vernuccio
 Alessandro Vezzosi
 Adolfo Vitta
 Louis Waldman
 Giorgio Weber
 Detlef Weis
 Gerard Wolf

Past members
Past honorary members include:

 Giulio Andreotti

References

Accademia delle Arti del Disegno of Florence